Mai Gulan was the mother of Mian Ghulam Shah Kalhoro and wife of Mian Noor Muhammad Kalhoro. She was queen of Kalhora dynasty of Sindh. Her tomb is situated in the necropolis of her husband at a distance of 15 kilometers from Daulatpur, Nawabshah District (now Shaheed Benazirabad District), Sindh, Pakistan towards the east.  The shah built a palace for her. She built a mosque and madrasa for religious teachings near Pacco Qillo Hyderabad Sindh.

References

History of Sindh
Sindhi people